The White Squadron (Escadrila Albă) or Escadrila 108 Transport ușor was a Royal Romanian Air Force squadron of air ambulances piloted by women in the World War II. They flew Polish RWD 13S planes.

The 1944 Italian-Romanian film  was inspired by the squadron's story.

Notable pilots
Smaranda Brăescu
Mariana Drăgescu
Marina Știrbei
Nadia Russo

References

Further reading
Cristian Crăciunoiu, Jean-Louis Roba, Escadrila Albă (The White Squadron), București, Editura Modelism, 2002,

External links
Escadrila albă 2012 video about the Squadron, in Romanian

Air ambulance services
Medical units and formations
Evacuations
Romanian Air Force
All-female military units and formations
Romanian women aviators
Military history of Romania during World War II